Li Qingnian (born March 23, 1981 in Beijing) is a female Chinese sports shooter.

In the 2004 Summer Olympics, she finished fourth in the women's double trap competition. She also won the 2003 ISSF World Cup Final in Double Trap and defended her title in the next year's competition, becoming the last woman to win a World Cup title in this now non-Olympic event.

External links
 profile

1981 births
Living people
Chinese female sport shooters
Olympic shooters of China
Sport shooters from Beijing
Shooters at the 2004 Summer Olympics
Trap and double trap shooters
Asian Games medalists in shooting
Shooters at the 2010 Asian Games
Shooters at the 2018 Asian Games
Asian Games gold medalists for China
Medalists at the 2010 Asian Games
Medalists at the 2018 Asian Games